Ginásio Paulo Sarasate is an indoor sporting arena located in Fortaleza, Brazil.  The capacity of the arena is 10,000 spectators and opened in 1971.  It hosts indoor sporting events such as basketball and volleyball, and also hosts concerts.

External links
Arena information

Indoor arenas in Brazil
Sports venues in Ceará
Basketball venues in Brazil